"Strike A Match" is the debut single by American Idol season fifteen third place finalist Dalton Rapattoni and is also his coronation song from the contest.

Critical response 

The song was described as "definitely a good fit for him". It was described as very upbeat and fast paced with an inspirational spirit to it that should do well for Rapattoni whether or not he had secured the title.

Commercial performance 
"Strike A Match" was released after his performance on American Idol, and based on just two days of sales, it reached No. 38 on Rock Digital Songs, No. 25 on Alternative Digital Songs, and Hot Rock Songs at No. 46, with 6,000 copies sold.

Charts

References 

2016 singles
2016 songs
American Idol songs
19 Recordings singles
Big Machine Records singles